Linda "Titi" Ochoa (born January 2, 1987) is a Mexican compound archer. She is the current World Archery number eight in women's compound archery. The highest ranking she has reached is the sixth position, which she reached for the last time in April 2011.

Ochoa has announced that she will give up competing for Mexico, citing "deception and blackmail" by other archers. As of January 2019, she has retired from competition, complaining about a lack of funding.

Achievements
Source:

2003
55th, World Outdoor Championships, individual, New York City
2004
 Grand Prix Mexicano, individual, Mexico City
2005
17th, World Outdoor Championships, individual, Madrid
2006
 World Cup, women's team, Antalya
 World Cup, women's team, San Salvador
 Central American and Caribbean Games, individual, Cartagena
 World Cup, individual, Shanghai
2007
30th, World Outdoor Championships, individual, Leipzig
 World Ranking Tournament, individual, Medellín
2008
 Grand Prix Mexicano, individual, Mérida, Yucatán
 World Cup, women's team, Santo Domingo
 Pan American Championships, individual, Valencia, Carabobo
2009
 World Cup, women's team, Santo Domingo
6th, Summer Universiade, women's team, Belgrade
10th, Summer Universiade, individual, Belgrade
 World Cup, women's team, Shanghai
4th, World Outdoor Championships, women's team, Ulsan
24th, World Outdoor Championships, individual, Ulsan

2010
 Arizona Cup, women's team, Phoenix, Arizona
 World Cup, women's team, Poreč
 World Cup, mixed team, Antalya
 Central American and Caribbean Games, individual, Mayaguez
 Central American and Caribbean Games, women's team, Mayaguez
 Central American and Caribbean Games, mixed team, Mayaguez
 World Cup, mixed team, Shanghai
 World Cup, individual, Shanghai
6th, World Cup Final, individual, Edinburgh
 Pan American Championships, women's team, Guadalajara
 Pan American Championships, mixed team, Guadalajara
 Pan American Championships, individual, Guadalajara
2011
 Arizona Cup, women's team, Phoenix, Arizona
4th, World Outdoor Championships, women's team, Turin
6th, World Outdoor Championships, mixed team, Turin
17th, World Outdoor Championships, individual, Turin
4th, Summer Universiade, women's team, Shenzhen
6th, Summer Universiade, mixed team, Shenzhen
9th, Summer Universiade, individual, Shenzhen
 World Cup, mixed team, Shanghai
2012
 World Indoor Championships, individual, Las Vegas
6th, World Indoor Championships, women's team, Las Vegas
 Arizona Cup, mixed team, Phoenix, Arizona
 Arizona Cup, women's team, Phoenix, Arizona
 Pan American Championships, women's team, San Salvador
 Pan American Championships, mixed team, San Salvador
5th, Pan American Championships, individual, San Salvador

References

External links
 

Mexican female archers
Living people
1987 births
Sportspeople from Guadalajara, Jalisco
Central American and Caribbean Games gold medalists for Mexico
Competitors at the 2018 Central American and Caribbean Games
Central American and Caribbean Games medalists in archery
World Games silver medalists
Competitors at the 2017 World Games
Competitors at the 2022 World Games
21st-century Mexican women